Charles Michael Lorre (born Charles Michael Levine; October 18, 1952) is an American film & television director, writer, producer, composer, and actor.

Called the "King of Sitcoms", he has created/co-created and produced sitcoms including Grace Under Fire, Cybill, Dharma & Greg, Two and a Half Men, The Big Bang Theory, Mike & Molly, Mom, Young Sheldon, The Kominsky Method, Disjointed, Bob Hearts Abishola, B Positive, United States of Al, and How to Be a Bookie. He also served as an executive producer of Roseanne. He won Golden Globe Awards for Roseanne (1993) and Cybill (1996), and won the 2019 Golden Globe Award for The Kominsky Method. In the 1990s, he founded Chuck Lorre Productions.

Early life and education
Lorre was born in Plainview, New York, to a Jewish family and given the Hebrew name Chaim. His father, Robert, opened a luncheonette that did poorly, which caused financial problems. After graduating from high school, Lorre attended State University of New York at Potsdam, dropping out after two years to pursue a career as a songwriter. During his two years at college he "majored in rock 'n' roll and pot and minored in LSD". In 2011, he admitted to drinking heavily in his past, telling Entertainment Weekly (EW) that he "led a dissolute youth until 47." He was in recovery at the time. Substance-related issues are also a recurring theme in his work.

He changed his surname from Levine to Lorre at age 26.

Career

After leaving school, Lorre toured the United States as a guitarist and songwriter. He wrote the song "French Kissin'", which Deborah Harry later recorded for her 1986 Rockbird album and became a UK Top 10 hit. In the early 1980s he turned to writing scripts for animated shows; his first project was the DIC version of Heathcliff. He co-wrote the soundtrack to the 1987 television series Teenage Mutant Ninja Turtles with Dennis Challen Brown. In the late 1980s, he shifted into writing for sitcoms, and joined the writing staff of Roseanne. Though he was fired over irreconcilable creative differences, Lorre's time on Roseanne impressed producers, and led to his creating his first show, Frannie's Turn. It was cancelled after 5 weeks.

Lorre's second show as creator, Grace Under Fire, starred comedian Brett Butler. It premiered on ABC in 1993, and was nominated at the 52nd Golden Globe Awards for Best Television Series – Musical or Comedy. His next show was Cybill, starring Cybill Shepherd. It aired for four seasons on CBS and received critical acclaim, winning a Primetime Emmy Award in 1995 for Outstanding Supporting Actress in a Comedy Series for co-star Christine Baranski, and two Golden Globe Awards in 1996 for Best Television Series – Musical or Comedy and Best Actress in a Television Series – Musical or Comedy for Cybill Shepherd. Lorre signed a deal with Carsey-Werner Productions in 1994. He then moved to 20th Century Fox in 1995 to create the next project.

Dharma & Greg was the fourth show he created, in partnership with Dottie Zicklin (credited as Dottie Dartland), which premiered one year before the end of Cybill in 1997. (Lorre had left Cybill in season two.) It starred Jenna Elfman and Thomas Gibson as the title characters, whose personalities were complete opposites—Dharma's world view being more spiritual and 'free spirit'-style, instilled by "hippie" parents, contrasted with Greg's world view of structure, social status requirements, and "white collar duty" instilled by his generations of affluent parents/ancestors. The show received eight Golden Globe nominations, six Emmy Award nominations, and six Satellite Awards nominations, and Elfman won a Golden Globe for Best Actress in 1999. To move on to his next project, Lorre signed a long-term deal with Warner Bros. Television in 2000, a relationship that continues to this day.

Lorre created his fifth show, Two and a Half Men, with co-creator Lee Aronsohn. It focuses on two Harper brothers, Charlie and Alan. Charlie is a hedonistic, successful commercial jingles composer and womanizer who owns a beach house in Malibu. When Alan is thrown out of his house by his wife, he worms himself into Charlie's house. Alan also has a little son, Jake, the "half", who comes to visit him and Charlie on weekends. Two and a Half Men premiered on CBS in 2003 and became the highest-rated sitcom in America. In 2011, CBS put the show on hiatus following many incidents of production shutdowns due to Charlie Sheen's alleged problems related to drug and alcohol abuse and greed, which culminated to the verbal attacks directed at Lorre during a radio interview. Sheen was fired from the show and filed a $100 million lawsuit against Lorre and Warner Bros. Television for wrongful termination. Lorre killed off Sheen's character and hired Ashton Kutcher as his replacement for the show's later four seasons.

Lorre's next show was The Big Bang Theory with co-creator Bill Prady. It follows two genius physicists with few social skills who befriend their neighbor, an attractive, outgoing young woman with average intelligence and no college education. The episodes usually focus primarily on the daily lives of the men and two of their brilliant but equally socially challenged friends, with a dose of absurdity from the relationship with their less educated but socially astute neighbor. The two main protagonists, Sheldon and Leonard, are named after actor and television producer Sheldon Leonard. The show was broadcast on CBS from 2007 to 2019 and was the highest rated comedy series in the United States.

Lorre was executive producer of Mike & Molly, created by Mark Roberts, which premiered on CBS in September 2010. His seventh show, created with Gemma Baker and Eddie Gorodetsky, Mom, premiered on CBS on September 23, 2013. On March 13, 2014, CBS announced the second season renewal of Mom. It ran for eight seasons.

Controversy surrounded United States of Al, a show produced by Lorre for CBS. Released to mostly negative reviews, United States of Al and its makers were criticized for the show's humor, use of antiquated tropes, and in particular, the casting of a South-African-born Indian actor to play an Afghan lead and his use of an inauthentic accent.

Vanity cards

The unique vanity cards for Chuck Lorre Productions have become a "trademark" for Lorre, starting with Dharma & Greg and used for every one of his shows since. An Apple Macintosh computer was used for Lorre's production card on the earlier Grace Under Fire and Cybill.

Typically, on the end of every episode of his productions, Lorre includes a different message that usually reads like an editorial, essay, or observation on life. A typical card might include a range of topics as diverse as what the Bee Gees never learned, the cancellation of Dharma & Greg, his support of Barack Obama, the competence of AOL Time Warner management, and the genesis of Two and a Half Men.

The card is shown for only a few seconds at most, so longer messages require the viewer to pause at the right spot, or visit Lorre's website where he posts the cards. CBS has censored Lorre's vanity cards on several occasions; Lorre posts both the censored and uncensored versions of the cards.

During Charlie Sheen's controversial departure from Two and a Half Men in 2011, Lorre referenced Sheen in several cards. Lorre used the vanity card for the series finale, "Of Course He's Dead", to address the circumstances of Sheen's absence from the episode.

Lorre published a compilation of his vanity cards in a coffee table book titled What Doesn't Kill Us Makes Us Bitter, released on October 16, 2012.  The book takes its title from Vanity Card #1, which first aired following the first episode of Dharma & Greg on September 24, 1997.

During The Big Bang Theory episode titled "The Hook-Up Reverberation", Vanity Card #463 was displayed. It discussed Lorre's lost or matured angst along with the news that he would stop writing the vanity cards. Vanity card #464 was shown after the next episode, stating it was his last and that he felt like they would not be missed. However, he resumed the cards. Card #493 on March 5, 2015 was a tribute to the late Leonard Nimoy, who had guest-starred on the show as the voice of Sheldon's conscience three years earlier.

When Channing Dungey, chairwoman and CEO of Warner Bros. Television Studios discussed the reemergence of the sitcom in a February 2023 Deadline article, Deadline opined "There are fewer and fewer younger writers that are attracted to the form, however, making finding the next Chuck Lorre trickier," with Dungey commenting "I worry that it’s becoming a bit of a lost art". When Lorre read this, he used Vanity Card #723 to ask "The next Chuck Lorre?! What the &$@? is wrong with the one you have now?!".

Selected credits

Awards and recognition
Lorre won BMI Television Music Awards in 2004, 2005, 2008 and 2009 for Two and a Half Men.

On March 12, 2009, Lorre received a star on the Hollywood Walk of Fame, located at 7021 Hollywood Boulevard.

Three months later, Lorre received an honorary degree from the State University of New York at Potsdam and gave a keynote address at the graduation.

Lorre was inducted into the Television Academy Hall of Fame in March 2012.

Lorre won Golden Globe Awards for Roseanne (1993), Cybill (1996), and The Kominsky Method (2019).

Also in 2019, Lorre was awarded the Critics' Choice Award for Creative Achievement.

Personal life
Lorre was first married to his business partner Paula Smith in 1979. They ended both partnerships after 13 years and the births of their two children.

He was married to actress and former Playboy Playmate Karen Witter for 10 years before their divorce in July 2010.

From 2010 to 2011, he was in a relationship with Canadian actress and model Emmanuelle Vaugier, who appeared in 12 episodes of Two and a Half Men as a ballet teacher and the main character's love interest.

In September 2018, Lorre married Arielle Mandelson. Lorre filed for divorce in 2022.

He has publicly discussed his decades of struggle with the autoimmune disease ulcerative colitis,  depression, anxiety, and anger/rage, saying, "Put me in paradise and I will focus on the one thing that will make me angry." In an interview with Entertainment Weekly, he said, "I am wired on some deep level to seek out something to be worried and obsess about."

References

External links

 
 
 

1952 births
Living people
20th-century American Jews
21st-century American composers
21st-century American Jews
21st-century American male musicians
American film directors
American male composers
American male television writers
American television directors
Jewish American television producers
Screenwriters from New York (state)
Showrunners
State University of New York people
Television producers from New York City
Writers from New York City